Roscoe Wayne Scott was an American football and track and field coach.  He served as the head football coach at Carthage College in Carthage, Illinois for three seasons, from 1947 to 1949, compiling a record of 11–12–2.  Scott also coached track and field at Carthage.

Head coaching record

Football

References

Year of birth missing
Year of death missing
Carthage Firebirds football coaches
College track and field coaches in the United States
Monmouth College alumni
University of Illinois Urbana-Champaign alumni